Schney station is a railway station in the Schney district of the town of Lichtenfels, located in the Lichtenfels district in Upper Franconia, Germany. The station is on the Eisenach–Lichtenfels line of Deutsche Bahn.

References

Railway stations in Bavaria
Railway stations in Germany opened in 1894
1894 establishments in Bavaria
Buildings and structures in Lichtenfels (district)